Saccharopolyspora halophila is a halophilic bacterium from the genus Saccharopolyspora which has been isolated from a salt lake from Xinjiang in China.

References

 

Pseudonocardineae
Bacteria described in 2009
Halophiles